Dharmendra Singh (born 2 December 1978) is an Indian former cricketer. He played one first-class match for Bengal in 1998/99.

See also
 List of Bengal cricketers

References

External links
 

1978 births
Living people
Indian cricketers
Bengal cricketers
People from Ahmednagar district